Law of logic may refer to:

Basic laws of Propositional Logic or First Order Predicate Logic
Laws of thought, which present first principles (arguably) before reasoning begins
Rules of inference, which dictate the valid use of inferential reasoning